Pyramid power refers to the belief that the ancient Egyptian pyramids and objects of similar shape can confer a variety of benefits. Among these assumed properties are the ability to preserve foods, sharpen or maintain the sharpness of razor blades, improve health, function "as a thought-form incubator", trigger sexual urges, and cause other effects. Such unverified conjectures regarding pyramids are collectively known as pyramidology.

There is no scientific evidence that pyramid power exists.

History 
In the 1930s, a French ironmonger and pendulum-dowsing author, Antoine Bovis, developed the idea that small models of pyramids can preserve food. The story persists that Bovis, while standing inside the King's Chamber of the Great Pyramid in Egypt, saw a garbage can inside the chamber piled with dead animals that had wandered into the structure, noticed that these small carcasses were not decaying and inferred that the structure somehow preserved them. However, Bovis never claimed to have visited Egypt.  In his self-published French-language booklet Bovis ascribes his discovery to reasoning and experiments in Europe using a dowsing pendulum:

In 1949, inspired by Bovis, a Czechoslovakian named Karel Drbal applied for a patent on a "Pharaoh's shaving device", a model pyramid alleged to maintain the sharpness of razor blades. According to the patent (#91,304), "The method of maintaining the razor blades and straight razor blades sharp by placing them in the magnetic field in such a way that the sharp edge lies in the direction of the magnetic lines." Drbal alleged that his device would focus "the earth's magnetic field", although he did not make it clear how this would work, or whether the device's shape or materials exerted the effect.

Drbal's contention that razors could be sharpened or have their sharpness maintained by alignment with Earth's magnetic field was not new. In 1933, The Times carried letters claiming, "if I oriented my razor blades... N. and S. by the compass... they tend to last considerably longer" and "The idea of keeping razor blades in a magnetic field is not quite new. About the year 1900 I found this out".

Sheila Ostrander and Lynn Schroeder, authors of the paranormal, visited Czechoslovakia in 1968, where they happened upon a cardboard pyramid manufactured commercially by Drbal. They met Drbal, and dedicated a chapter of their popular 1970 book Psychic Discoveries Behind the Iron Curtain to pyramid power. This book introduced both the concept of pyramid power and the story about Antoine Bovis to the English-speaking world.

Origin of the term 
Debate continues over who coined the term "pyramid power". Author Max Toth has claimed he coined the phrase, as has Patrick Flanagan. Both authors released books entitled Pyramid Power in the 1970s. According to Toth, this led to a lawsuit by Flanagan against him.

However, the term "pyramid power" in its current usage first appeared in print in Sheila Ostrander and Lynn Schroeder's 1970 book Psychic Discoveries Behind the Iron Curtain. Ostrander and Schroeder claim that "Czechoslovakian researchers" coined the term in the 1960s.

Popularisation 
Flanagan's book was featured on the cover and in the lyrics of The Alan Parsons Project album Pyramid. "Pyramania", a song from the album, mocked the idea of pyramid power.

Martin Gardner spoofed pyramid power in his "Mathematical Games" column in the Scientific American issue of June 1974, featuring his recurring fictional characters Dr. Matrix and Iva Matrix.

The conjectures of pyramid power convinced the Onan Family, hotel and condo developers in Gurnee, Illinois, to build the "Pyramid House" in 1977.

Summerhill Pyramid Winery in Kelowna, British Columbia built a four-story replica of the Great Pyramid, alleged by the winery to improve the quality of wine aged within it.

A religion founded in 1975, called Summum, completed the construction of a pyramid called the Summum Pyramid in Salt Lake City, Utah in 1979.

Pyramid power was used by the Toronto Maple Leafs and their coach Red Kelly during the 1975–76 quarter-final series, to counter the Philadelphia Flyers' use of Kate Smith's rendering of "God Bless America". Kelly hung a plastic model of a pyramid in the team's clubhouse after a pair of away defeats at the start of the series, and each player took turns standing under it for exactly four minutes. The Maple Leafs managed to win all three of their home matches before losing the series' decisive game seven.

Terry Pratchett's fantasy novel Pyramids incorporates elements of the conjecture when an industry develops around pyramids' ability to stop time.

It is common in New Age magazines to see advertisements for open metal-poled pyramids large enough to meditate under. The New Age group Share International, founded by Benjamin Creme, practices a form of meditation called 'Transmission Meditation' using an open metal-poled tetrahedron, which according to their beliefs tunes into the cosmic energy of Maitreya and other spiritual masters.

Skepticism 
The neurologist and skeptic Terence Hines has written that pyramid power is a pseudoscience and tests have failed to provide any evidence for its claims:

In 2005, an episode of MythBusters was aired on the Discovery Channel in which a basic test of pyramid power was performed, using pyramids built to the specifications found in pyramid power claims, reflecting the location of the King's Chamber in the Great Pyramid of Giza. Several claims were tested, concerning food rotting, a flower rotting and a razor blade going dull. With control protocols in place, there was no significant difference between items in pyramids and items outside.

See also 
 Pyramidology
 List of topics characterized as pseudoscience

References

Further reading 
Alter, A. (1973). The Pyramid and Food Dehydration. New Horizons 1: 92–94.
Simmons, D. (1973). Experiments on the Alleged Sharpening of Razor Blades and the Preservation of Flowers by Pyramids. New Horizons 1: 95-101.

External links 
  Pyramid Power: original research that details on origins, makers and backgrounds.
 Pyramidiocy – Skeptic's Dictionary

Forteana
New Age
Paranormal terminology
Pseudoscience
Pyramidology